Anvilles is a hamlet in the English county of Berkshire, and within the civil parish of Inkpen (formerly in Kintbury).

See also
Civil parishes in England

Hamlets in Berkshire